Tim Georgi (born 16 May 2000) is a German motorcycle racer. He competes in the FIM CEV Moto3 Junior World Championship aboard a KTM RC250GP. He was the ADAC KTM Junior Cup champion in 2014, the IDM Moto3 Standard champion in 2015 and the ADAC Northern Europe Cup GP champion in 2017. He made his Grand Prix debut in the Moto3 class as a wild-card rider in the 2016 German Grand Prix.

Career statistics

Grand Prix motorcycle racing

By season

Races by year

References

External links

Living people
German motorcycle racers
Moto3 World Championship riders
2000 births
Sportspeople from Berlin
Supersport 300 World Championship riders